Surra may refer to:
Surra, a disease
Surra, Kuwait, a district
Surra, Davachi, Azerbaijan
Surra, Sabirabad, Azerbaijan
Sarra, Nablus, older name of Sarra